The Versailles School and Tyson Auditorium is a historic school and auditorium located at Versailles, Ripley County, Indiana.  The school was built in 1938, and is a two-story, flat roofed Art Deco style building.  The auditorium was added in 1950.  James H. Tyson, a founder of Walgreens, funded the buildings.  The famous Milan basketball team often played its games in the building, as their home court was often too small for all the spectators.

It was added to the National Register of Historic Places in 2006.

In 2011 it was listed on Indiana Landmarks 10 Most Endangered Landmarks list. In 2011, the school was transformed into apartments and the auditorium has now been reopened and renamed Tyson Activity Center.

References

Apartment buildings in Indiana
Residential buildings on the National Register of Historic Places in Indiana
School buildings on the National Register of Historic Places in Indiana
Art Deco architecture in Indiana
Basketball venues in Indiana
Defunct basketball venues in the United States
High school sports in Indiana
National Register of Historic Places in Ripley County, Indiana
1938 establishments in Indiana
Event venues on the National Register of Historic Places in Indiana